Ludwig van Beethoven's Rondo for Piano and Orchestra in B-flat major, WoO 6 was composed in 1793 and originally intended as the final movement for his second piano concerto. Hans-Werner Küthen states this was probably the finale for the first  and second versions of the second piano concerto, being replaced by the final version of the rondo in 1795. He also notes that the most likely inspiration for the insertion of an andante section into the rondo is the concluding rondo of Mozart's Piano Concerto No. 22.

It was eventually published in 1829, with the solo part completed by Carl Czerny.  It is scored for an orchestra of 1 flute, 2 oboes, 2 bassoons, 2 horns, and strings.

Movements

The composition consists of a single multi-tempo movement marked Rondo: Allegro – Andante – Tempo I – Presto.

References
Notes

Sources

External links

Piano music by Ludwig van Beethoven
1793 compositions
Compositions in B-flat major
Musical compositions completed by others
Compositions by Ludwig van Beethoven published posthumously